Lanny is a masculine personal name attributed as a variation of Laurence (bay tree) or Roland (from the renowned land) and may refer to:

People
 Lanny Bassham (born 1947), American sports shooter, 1976 Olympic champion
Lanny Berman (born 1943), American psychologist, psychotherapist, and suicidologist
 Lanny Boleski (born c. 1941), retired Canadian Football League player
 Lanny Breuer (born 1958), American lawyer and former Assistant Attorney General for the Criminal Division of the U.S. Department of Justice
 Lanny Cordola (born 1961), American guitarist
 Lanny Davis (born 1945), American lawyer
 Alan O. Ebenstein (born 1959), American political scientist, educator and author
 Lanny Fite (born c. 1950), American politician 
 Lanny Frattare (born 1948), American former sportscaster
 Lanny Gare (born 1978), Canadian-born German professional ice hockey player
 Neal Lane Lanny Johnson (born 1940), American politician and school superintendent
 Lanny McDonald (born 1953), Canadian former National Hockey League player
 Lanny Meyers (born 1956), American composer, orchestrator, principal arranger and musical director
 Lanny Morgan (born 1934), American jazz alto saxophonist
 Lanny Poffo (1954-2023), Canadian-American professional wrestler
 Lancelot Lanny Ross (1906-1988), American singer, pianist and songwriter
 Lanny D. Schmidt (born 1938), American chemist
 Lanny Steele (1933-1994), American jazz pianist
 Jerry Lanston Lanny Wadkins (born 1949), American golfer
 Lanny Wolfe (born 1942), American Christian music songwriter
Larry Worden (born 1961), American Senator

Fictional characters
 Lanny Budd, protagonist of 11 novels by Upton Sinclair

Lanny Lloyd, main character in Lanny, a novel by Max Porter.

Lanny, a worker bee who served in the stinging fields in BC Fourteen's Bee Team series of films.

References

English masculine given names
Hypocorisms